Alethe "Alette" Wilhelmine Georgine Due, née Sibbern (28 February 1812, Værne Kloster – 7 May 1887, Oslo), was a Norwegian singer, composer and courtier. She was an honorary member of the Royal Swedish Academy of Music, and served as Overhoffmesterinne for Queen Sophia of Norway in 1873–1887.

Life
Alette Due was born to councillor of state Valentin Christian Wilhelm Sibbern (1779–1853) and Anne Cathrine Stockfleth (1785–1865) and sister of prime minister Georg Sibbern and Carl Sibbern. In 1828 she married Frederik Due.

Musician
Her spouse was Norwegian state secretary stationed in Stockholm in 1822–1841, and Prime minister of Norway in 1841–1850.  When her spouse was stationed in Stockholm, she became a central figure of the Norwegian-Swedish high society in the Swedish capital during the Norwegian-Swedish Union. 

Due was a non-professional musician of note: she performed as singer and composed songs as well as piano music. She was a member of the musical society Harmoniska Sällskapet ('Harmonic Society') in Stockholm, and was inducted as Honorary member to the Royal Swedish Academy of Music 30 December 1850.

Court career
In 1840, when she was living in Sweden where her spouse was posted in the Swedish capital, she was appointed statsfru (lady-in-waiting) to the Swedish royal court.  In 1873, after the succession of king Oscar to the throne, she was appointed principal lady-in-waiting or Overhoffmesterinne for Queen Sophia of Norway, an office she kept until her death.  During the Union of Sweden and Norway, the Royal family mainly stayed in Sweden, and the Norwegian court staff served during their visits in Norway: during the royal visit, the king and queen took leave of their Swedish entourage at the border and was met by their Norwegian Household, in whose company they remained until the passed the border back to Sweden again. The Norwegian court was however smaller: in 1874 her Swedish equivalent Elisabet Augusta Piper had three ladies-in-waiting under her while Alette Due had but one.

Works
Songs for piano
 L’Exilé (X. Marmier). Romancer med piano componerede og Hendes Kongelige Höghet Prindsesse Eugenie underdanigst tilegnede. Songs for piano. Dedicated to Princess Eugénie.
 Till den frånvarande, i: Förgät mig ej! Album för sång vid piano, vol. 1, Stockholm: Svanberg, 1855., Song for Piano, printed in Stockholm 1855
 Tre sånger: 1. O, klarögda källa, 2. Dväljen er, suckar svalkande vinden!, 3. Beskows dröm (”Jag drömde du en blomma var”). Three Songs. Dedicated to Princess Eugénie.
Piano music
 La Rose et le Réséda, deux valses composées pour le pianoforte, valser.

References

 Nyström, Pia; Kyhlberg-Boström Anna, Elmquist Anne-Marie (1996). Kungl. Musikaliska akademien: matrikel 1771–1995. Kungl. Musikaliska akademiens skriftserie, 0347-5158 ; 84. Stockholm: Musikaliska akad.. Libris 7749167.  (inb.)
 ”Alette Wilhelmine Georgine Sibbern (1812 - 1887)”. Läst 2 juni 2013.

1812 births
1887 deaths
Mistresses of the Robes (Norway)
Norwegian classical composers
19th-century Norwegian women singers
Women classical composers
19th-century classical composers
19th-century Norwegian composers
19th-century women composers
Norwegian ladies-in-waiting